Dernancourt is a north-eastern suburb of Adelaide, located in both Tea Tree Gully and Port Adelaide Enfield council areas. It is approximately 10 kilometres from the Adelaide CBD.

Education
Education is provided by Dernancourt Primary School and Dernancourt Junior Primary School, located on Parsons Road.

Eponym
"Dernancourt" is named after the Battle of Dernancourt which took place on 28 March 1918 during World War I. According to historical records, South Australian soldiers, including many from the Tea Tree Gully area played a crucial part in the defence of Allied positions, with approximately 1230 Australians losing their lives in the battle. According to the City of Tea Tree Gully, the suburb was created by Richard Arthur Hobby on land owned by him. who named the suburb in recognition of the Battle of Dernancourt and our soldiers’ ultimate sacrifice.

References

Suburbs of Adelaide